Wallace Herman "Wally" Richardson (born February 11, 1974) is a former American football quarterback.

Professional career
Richardson played college football at Penn State.

He was drafted by the Baltimore Ravens in the seventh round of the 1997 NFL Draft. In three years in the NFL, two with the Ravens and one with the Atlanta Falcons, Richardson had a regular season total of 1 career passing yard. 

After spending the 2000 season out of football, Richardson was signed by the XFL's New York/New Jersey Hitmen early in the season. As part of a kayfabe quarterback controversy, Richardson (who, as part of the sports entertainment approach the XFL used, was given an angle in which his larger hands were an advantage he had over his small-handed predecessor, local native Charley Puleri) was given the starting quarterback job in week 3, a position he held for the rest of the year. Immediately after the Hitmen's season ended, Richardson joined the Arena Football League's Los Angeles Avengers, he was waived prior to training camp in 2002.

Post football

Upon his retirement from professional football, Richardson joined Penn State’s Morgan Academic Support Center for Student-Athletes, first as a graduate assistant in 2001 and then as an academic counselor from 2003-07. From 2007-11, Richardson served as the associate director of the Rankin Smith Student-Athlete Service Center at the University of Georgia, working with members of the football, women’s volleyball and equestrian teams. He was named associate director of football academic support at the University of North Carolina before the 2011 football season.

In April 2013, Richardson was named director of the Penn State Football Letterman’s Club, an organization of more than 1,500 former Penn State football players and student managers.

References

1974 births
Living people
American football quarterbacks
Penn State Nittany Lions football players
Players of American football from South Carolina
Baltimore Ravens players
London Monarchs players
Atlanta Falcons players
Los Angeles Avengers players
Sportspeople from Sumter, South Carolina
New York/New Jersey Hitmen players